Sippar (Sumerian: , Zimbir) was an ancient Near Eastern Sumerian and later Babylonian city on the east bank of the Euphrates river. The city's ancient name, Sippar, could also refer to its sister city, Sippar-Amnanum (located at the modern site of Tell ed-Der); a more specific designation for the city here referred to as Sippar was Sippar-Yahrurum.

History

Despite the fact that thousands of cuneiform clay tablets have been recovered at the site, relatively little is known about the history of Sippar. As was often the case in Mesopotamia, it was part of a pair of cities, separated by a river. Sippar was on the east side of the Euphrates, while its sister city, Sippar-Amnanum (modern Tell ed-Der), was on the west.

While pottery finds indicate that the site of Sippar was in use as early as the Uruk period, substantial occupation occurred only in the Early Dynastic Period of the 3rd millennium BC, the Old Babylonian period of the 2nd millennium BC, and the Neo-Babylonian time of the 1st millennium BC. Lesser levels of use continued into the time of the Achaemenid, Seleucid and Parthian Empires.

Sippar was the cult site of the sun god (Sumerian Utu, Akkadian Shamash) and the home of his temple E-babbara (𒂍𒌓𒌓𒊏, means "white house").

During early Babylonian dynasties, Sippar was the production center of wool. The Code of Hammurabi stele was probably erected at Sippar. Shamash was the god of justice, and he is depicted handing authority to the king in the image at the top of the stele. A closely related motif occurs on some cylinder seals of the Old Babylonian period. By the end of the 19th century BC, Sippar was producing some of the finest Old Babylonian cylinder seals.

Sippar has been suggested as the location of the Biblical Sepharvaim in the Old Testament, which alludes to the two parts of the city in its dual form.

Rulers
In the Sumerian king list a king of Sippar, En-men-dur-ana, is listed as one of the early pre-dynastic rulers of the region but has not yet turned up in the epigraphic records.

In his 29th year of reign Sumu-la-El of Babylon reported building the city wall of Sippar. Some years later Hammurabi of Babylon reported laying the foundations of the city wall of Sippar in his 23rd year and worked on the wall again in his 43rd year. His successor in Babylon, Samsu-iluna worked on Sippar's wall in his 1st year. The city walls, being typically made of mud bricks, required much attention. Records of Nebuchadnezzar II and Nabonidos record that they repaired the Shamash temple E-babbara.

Classical speculation
Xisuthros, the "Chaldean Noah" in Sumerian mythology, is said by Berossus to have buried the records of the antediluvian world here—possibly because the name of Sippar was supposed to be connected with sipru, "a writing". And according to Abydenus, Nebuchadnezzar II excavated a great reservoir in the neighbourhood.

Pliny (Natural History 6.30.123) mentions a sect of Chaldeans called the Hippareni. It is often assumed that this name refers to Sippar (especially because the other two schools mentioned seem to be named after cities as well: the Orcheni after Uruk, and the Borsippeni after Borsippa), but this is not universally accepted.

Archaeology

Tell Abu Habba, measuring over 1 square kilometer was first excavated by Hormuzd Rassam between 1880 and 1881 for the British Museum in a dig that lasted 18 months. Tens of thousands of tablets were recovered including the Tablet of Shamash in the Temple of Shamash/Utu. Most of the tablets were Neo-Babylonian. The temple had been mentioned as early as the 18th year of Samsu-iluna of Babylon, who reported restoring "Ebabbar, the temple of Szamasz in Sippar", along with the city's ziggurat.

The tablets, which ended up in the British Museum, are being studied to this day. As was often the case in the early days of archaeology, excavation records were not made, particularly find spots. This makes it difficult to tell which tablets came from Sippar-Amnanum as opposed to Sippar. Other tablets from Sippar were bought on the open market during that time and ended up at places like the British Museum and the University of Pennsylvania. Since the site is relatively close to Baghdad, it was a popular target for illegal excavations.

In 1894, Sippar was worked briefly by Jean-Vincent Scheil. The tablets recovered, mainly Old Babylonian, went to the Istanbul Museum. In modern times, the site was worked by a Belgian team from 1972 to 1973. Iraqi archaeologists from the College of Arts at the University of Baghdad, led by Walid al-Jadir with Farouk al-Rawi, have excavated at Tell Abu Habbah from 1977 through the present in 24 seasons. In the 8th season a library of over 300 tablets was discovered but few have yet been published due to conditions in Iraq. After 2000, they were joined by the German Archaeological Institute. According to Professor Andrew George, a cuneiform tablet containing a portion of the Epic of Gilgamesh probably came from Sippar.

In Sippar was the site where the Babylonian Map of the World was found.

Gallery

See also
List of cities of the ancient Near East

Notes

Further reading
 Rivkah Harris, Ancient Sippar : a demographic study of an old-Babylonian city, 1894-1595 B.C., Nederlands Historisch-Archaeologisch Instituut, 1975
 F. N. H. al-Rawi, Tablets from the Sippar Library I. The "Weidner Chronicle": A Suppositious Royal Letter concerning a Vision, Iraq, vol. 52, pp. 1–15, 1990
 F. N. H. al-Rawi and A. R. George, Tablets from the Sippar Library II. Tablet II of the Babylonian Creation Epic, Iraq, vol. 52, pp. 149–158, 1990
 F. N. H. al-Rawi and A. R. George, Tablets from the Sippar Library III. Two Royal Counterfeits, Iraq, vol. 56, pp. 135–149, 1994
 Luc Dekier, Old Babylonian real estate documents from Sippar in the British Museum, University of Ghent, 1994
 F. N. H. al-Rawi and A. R. George, Tablets from the Sippar Library IV. Lugale, Iraq, vol. 57, pp. 199–224, 1995
 John MacGinnis, Letter orders from Sippar and the administration of the Ebabbara in the late-Babylonian period, Bonami, 1995, 
 F. N. H. al-Rawi and A. R. George, Tablets from the Sippar Library V. An Incantation from Mis Pi, Iraq, vol. 57, pp. 225–228, 1995
 F. N. H. Al-Rawi and Andrew George, Tablets from the Sippar Library, VI. Atra-hasis, Iraq, vol. 58, pp. 147–190, 1996
 A. C. V. M. Bongenaar, The Neo-Babylonian Ebabbar Temple at Sippar : its administration and its prosopography, Nederlands Historisch-Archeologisch Instituut te Istanbul, 1997, 
 F. N. H. al-Rawi and A. R. George, Tablets from the Sippar Library VII. Three wisdom texts, Iraq, vol. 60, pp. 187–206, 1998
Ivan Starr and F. N. H. Al-Rawi, Tablets from the Sippar Library VIII. Omens from the Gall-Bladder, Iraq, vol. 61, pp. 173–185, 1999
 W. Horowitz and F. N. H. Al-Rawi , Tablets from the Sippar library IX. A ziqpu-star planisphere, Iraq, vol. 63, pp. 171–181, 2001
 F. N. H. al-Rawi, Tablets from the Sippar library X: A dedication of Zabaya of Larsa, Iraq, vol. 64, pp. 247–248, 2002
 Andrew George and Khalid Salim Ismail, Tablets from the Sippar library, XI. The Babylonian almanac, Iraq, vol. 64, pp. 249–258, 2002
Nils P. Heeßel and Farouk N. H. Al-Rawi, Tablets from the Sippar Library XII. A Medical Therapeutic Text, Iraq, vol. 65 , pp. 221–239, 2003
F. N. H. Al-Rawi and A. R. George, Tablets from the Sippar Library XIII: "Enūma Anu Ellil" XX, Iraq, vol. 68, pp. 23–57, 2006
 Theophilus Goldridge Pinches, The Antiquities found by Mr. H. Rassam at Abu-habbah (Sippara), Harrison and Sons, 1884
 K. De Graef, “Many a mickle makes a muckle : advance payments in the Ur-Utu archive (Old Babylonian Sippar),” AKKADICA, vol. 137, no. 1, pp. 1–51, 2016
 Reinhard Pirngruber, Minor Archives from First-Millennium Bce Babylonia: The Archive of Iššar-Tarībi from Sippar, Journal of Cuneiform Studies, vol. 72, pp. 165–198, 2020
 Verhulst, Astrid. “An Old Babylonian Seal from Sippar with Trading Owners.” Journal of Near Eastern Studies, vol. 74, no. 2, 2015, pp. 255–65

External links

German Archaeological Institute page for Sippar - in german
Site photographs at Oriental Institute
Year Named mentioning Sippar at CDLI

 
Populated places established in the 3rd millennium BC
1880 archaeological discoveries
Babil Governorate
Sumerian cities
Akkadian cities
Archaeological sites in Iraq
Former populated places in Iraq
Early Dynastic Period (Mesopotamia)
Former kingdoms